Nati Ninet Tayeb (born October 21, 1983), commonly known as Ninet, is an Israeli musician, singer-songwriter, composer, DJ, model, actress, and a reality television program judge in Rising Star: Israel. She is considered among the most famous people in the Israeli entertainment industry, and was labeled in 2015 as "One of the hottest new artists to break into the United States."

Early life

Ninet was born and raised in Kiryat Gat, Israel, to Maghrebi Jewish parents. Her father Yosef Tayeb was born in Tunisia, whereas her mother Marcelle (née Malka) was born in Morocco. Both her parents have separately immigrated to Israel. She is the third of five siblings and was nicknamed "Nina" at a very young age by her family and friends. Ninet served as a soldier in the Combat Engineering Corps of the Israel Defense Forces.

Ninet was brought up around music with performances in small events as a teenager. She was mainly influenced by artists such as Nirvana, Pearl Jam, and Oasis.

Career
Ninet has released four successful albums in Israel (one of them in English), and has twice won Israel's Favorite Act at the MTV Europe Music Awards. She has also worked with producer Mike Crossey (who produced her third album, Sympathetic Nervous System), and artists such as Steven Wilson, Gary Lucas, Cyndi Lauper, The Jesus and Mary Chain, and The Dead Daisies.

Alongside her musical career, Ninet has enjoyed a successful acting career, performing in movies, scripted series, and the theater. One of her first roles in theater was Wendla in the Israeli production of Spring Awakening. In 2018 Ninet had a role in the Israeli TV series, When Heroes Fly. Tayeb was also the singing voice for Mary Poppins in the Hebrew dub of the Disney movie, as well as the singing voice of Tiana in the Hebrew dub for Disney's The Princess And The Frog.

Ninet finished her first high-profile international tour in the U.S, Canada (Toronto & Montreal), and Europe in 2016. The tour featured songs from her recent release. It was her 5th album and the first to be released and promoted in the U.S. As part of her tour, Ninet was selected to perform at SXSW in March 2016. She was also featured as a guest vocalist on Steven Wilson's tour, who, after their successful collaborations in the past, invited her to join him for several performances.

The 2016 tour was the result of Ninet's short visit to the U.S in 2015, which created an extensive buzz and high demand for this "infectious female artist". During her time in the U.S, Ninet performed several concerts in New York City, which were praised by the critics. One of the critics stated that "having seen Ninet perform … it’s safe to say that the entire audience was fixated and almost hypnotized by her presence." Others claimed that "her bold renditions of songs like 'Crazy' and her original releases have showcased the range in which she approaches music and thus identifies with at least some part of all of us."

In preparation for her 2016 tour, Ninet released two new singles from her upcoming album – "Paper Parachute" and "Child". The two "promise an album worth waiting for", and were described as ones in which Ninet's "haunting vocals are backed by clever production work and energy fulfilling beats".

Early work

Barefoot and Acting

Fame was immediate for 20 year old Ninet, and she started to collaborate and perform with Israel's most popular artists. She became a known figure in Israel and was the subject of dozens of articles and stories.

Ninet released her debut album, "Barefoot" (Yechefa, Hebrew: יחפה) on September 7, 2006. It was certified Platinum in less than 24 hours, having charted five #1 singles on the national radio. Barefoot was released by Helicon and was produced and mainly composed and written by the Israeli Rock musician Aviv Geffen.

Ninet's acting career took rise as well, as she starred in a successful TV series based on her own life story. The show, Hashir Shelanu ("Our Song"), was intended to capitalize on Ninet's unprecedented popularity and lasted for four entire seasons.

Musical transformation

Communicative 
On November 17, 2009, Ninet released her second album, "Communicative", (Comunicativi, Hebrew: קומוניקטיבי). She wrote all the lyrics in the album, composed most of it, and produced the album with Rockfour.

Communicative, above all of Ninet's albums, was a musical shift. Its release was a turning point regarding Ninet's public image and musical tendencies, as she had thrown objects at her during its launch performance. Ninet describes this incident as a professional watershed. The artist who used to fill out major venues, found herself performing in front of significantly smaller audiences, sometimes fewer than 20 people.

Her exploration of musical influences began to bear fruit as Communicative was praised by critics and fans, and was considered to be one of the most talked about albums of recent years. A new type of audience began to attend her performances, which gradually started to grow and became more frequent.

Sympathetic Nervous System 
Ninet released her third album, "Sympathetic Nervous System" (SNS), on May 30, 2012. SNS received positive reviews and is considered one of Ninet's best albums.

The album was composed and written by Ninet in English, produced by Mike Crossey, and recorded at the Motor Museum Studio in Liverpool. In SNS Ninet continued to establish herself as an indie-rock singer-songwriter, twice winning Israel's Favorite Act at the MTV Europe Music Awards.

Ninet started to perform as a DJ at events and festivals in and outside of Israel.

All the Animals knew 
On May 3, 2013, Ninet released her fourth album, "All the Animals Knew" (Kol Haot Yadu). After the last album was all in English, this time Ninet went back to writing in Hebrew. She wrote and composed all of the songs in the album, except for 2 songs written by Israeli poet, Dori Manor. The album was produced by Joseph "Yossi" E-Shine Mizrachi (Ninet's future husband) and Idan Rabinovici, members of Israeli indie-rock band "Acollective".

Paper Parachute 
In 2015 Ninet released the singles "Paper Parachute" and "Child". In 2016 she released the singles "Superstar" and "Subservient". She moved from Israel to Los Angeles in the United States in July 2016, where she began to perform more regularly. Her fifth album "Paper Parachute" was released on February 3, 2017.

Other songs
In June 2015 she released a single called "What Happened" ('Ma Kara') in Hebrew. The song was created by Ninet and produced by her husband Joseph "Yossi" E-Shine Mizrachi. The song criticizes sexual attacks committed by people of high social status and their subsequent lack of appropriate punishment, and the system that ultimately blames the victims for daring to speak out.

On January 9, 2018, a new music video was released in Hebrew called "Hero" ('Gibor'), written by Ninet and composed by Israeli artist Dudu Tassa. The music video was filmed in the United States. In November 2018 she released her single "Self Destructive Mind".

In December 2018, as part of the annual Hanukkah celebrations, she performed with a variety of Israeli artists (Omer Adam, Marina Maximilian, the Ma Kashur trio, Idan Amadi, Nadav Gedge and Eleni Foureira) in a show called Pop Up Music in Tel Aviv, Israel.

International collaborations
 Steven Wilson – Ninet sang on two tracks on Steven Wilson's 2015 album, Hand. Cannot. Erase. He described Ninet as "inspiring" and "a fantastic singer" who has an "amazing voice" and is "very easy to work with". Ninet also performed alongside Wilson at the Royal Albert Hall in September 2015 and at Belasco Theater in LA November 2016. Ninet was again featured on a release by Wilson on "4½" on the new version of "Don't Hate Me", originally recorded by Wilson's other band Porcupine Tree on the album Stupid Dream. This version is sung as a duet between Wilson and Tayeb. That same year, Ninet was featured again on Wilson's tour, with appearances in both Europe and North America. In May 2017, Wilson released his single "Pariah" online, featuring vocals by Ninet. Ninet provides vocals for two other tracks on Wilson's album To the Bone (August 2017), as well as backing vocals on three other tracks. Tayeb performed with Wilson once more at the Royal Albert Hall in March 2018 as part of his Home Invasion concert series, and she is featured on several tracks on the recording of that concert, which was released on November 2, 2018.
 Gary Lucas – After meeting with Jeff Buckley's guitarist and songwriter, Gary Lucas, the latter invited Ninet to record a song which he co-wrote with Buckley but was never recorded. Ninet performed alongside Lucas in a tribute in Paris. Lucas summarized his work with Ninet saying that "Ninet is one of the best singers I've ever worked with. I think she's absolutely incredible, stunning, has a magnificence stage presence, and a terrific energy".
 Cyndi Lauper – Ninet was the opening act for Lauper in her concert in Israel in 2014, and performed a vocal duet of True Colors with Lauper during that concert.
 The Jesus and Mary Chain – In October 2012, Ninet was a surprise guest in the Indie legends Jesus and Mary Chain performance in Tel Aviv.
 The Dead Daisies – In December 2013, Ninet performed with the Australian rock n roll super-group, The Dead Daisies, as part of their tour in Tel Aviv, Israel.
 Robbie Williams – Ninet was the opening act for Robbie Williams during his 2015 performance in Tel Aviv.

Personal life
Tayeb was previously in a high-profile relationship with fellow HaShir Shelanu star Ran Danker. Israeli media labelled the pair "Raninet". She was later in another high-profile relationship with the Israeli actor, Yehuda Levi to whom she was engaged. Haaretz described them as "Israel's favorite celebrity couple", with The Jerusalem Post declaring them "Israel's Brangelina". They announced their split in 2013 after eight years together. Both Danker and Levi have been described as the two most talked-about male stars in Israel. Tayeb and Danker remain friends and when asked in a 2019 Ynet interview about his former partner, Danker said that they will soon be in touch and will collaborate. The pair performed together in September 2019.

In 2014, Tayeb married Israeli music producer and guitarist Joseph "Yossi" E-Shine Mizrachi in Tel Aviv, after a year together. In 2015, their first daughter Emilia Sarah Mizrachi was born. In 2016 they relocated to Los Angeles where she has written the follow-up album to Paper Parachute. In 2021, their second daughter Luna Rachel was born.

Discography
 2006 – Barefoot
 2009 – Communicative
 2012 – Sympathetic Nervous System
 2013 – All the Animals Knew
 2017 – Paper Parachute

Awards and nominations
 Sounds and Voices – First Place, 2001.
 Kokhav Nolad – First place, 2003.
 Golden Screen Awards – won Best Actress in A Daily Drama, 2005.
 Pnai Plus Magazine – The Beautiful "Right People" project – First place, 2005.
 Shir Nolad – First place, 2006.
 The Israeli Music Channel Awards – won Singer Of the Year award, 2007.
 Jerusalem Radio – Singer Of The Year, 2007.
 People Of The Year – nominated for Person Of The Year In Musics in 2006 and 2009.
 Song of The Decade project (Channel 24 and Galgalatz) – Singer of the decade nomination.
 MTV Europe Music Awards – Won Israel's favorite act, 2009.
 MTV Europe Music Awards – Won Israel's favorite act, 2012.

Other projects

 In 2015, Ninet was hosted in the second album of Dudu Tassa & The Kuwaitis, where she performed a song in Arabic. Dudu Tassa & The Kuwaitis is a special project led by Israeli musician Dudu Tassa, which relives the songs of Tassa's grandfather and great uncle, the Al-Kuwaiti Brothers, who were Jewish-Iraqi musicians famous in Israel and throughout the Arab world.
 In 2014, Ninet was hosted in Shlomi Shaban album "Wakening Exercise".
 From 2011 and on, Ninet performed and collaborated several times with the Israeli-American Puppeteers band, Red Band. Their most famous collaboration is a cover of Gnarls Barkley's hit "Crazy", as well as Radiohead's "High and Dry" , Annie Lennox's "I Put a Spell On You" and The Weeknd's "Can't Feel My Face".
 In 2011, Ninet collaborated with Israeli singer-songwriter, Gilad Cahana, within the album "The Walking Man 2". The album was entirely written in English. Ninet performed the songs of the album alongside Cahana.
 In 2010, Ninet took part in the original project "30+", led by the musicians Elad Cohen and Sagi Tzoref, where she performed a duet with Israeli singer-songwriter, Yali Sobol.
 In the annual musical project "Hebrew Labor" of 2008 (new versions of Israeli classics), Ninet recorded Ilan Virtzberg's song to late poet Yona Wallach lyrics, "I Couldn't Do Anything With This".
 In memory of Israeli music legend, late Ofra Haza, Ninet recorded, along with Ivri Lider, a pop rock version of Haza's song "This Pain". The duet became a hit in Israel in 2007.
 Throughout the years, Ninet was invited to perform in tribute concerts dedicated to several artists, such as Meir Ariel, Inbal Perlmutter, Elliott Smith, etc.

References

1983 births
Living people
Israeli women singer-songwriters
21st-century Israeli actresses
Israeli film actresses
Israeli women guitarists
Jewish Israeli musicians
Jewish Israeli actresses
Israeli people of Moroccan-Jewish descent
Israeli people of Tunisian-Jewish descent
Israeli Sephardi Jews
Israeli Mizrahi Jews
21st-century Israeli women singers
Israeli pop singers
English-language singers from Israel
21st-century guitarists
MTV Europe Music Award winners
Kokhav Nolad winners
21st-century women guitarists